Qanjeq-e Shahrak (also Romanized as Qānjeq-e Shahrak and Qānjeq Shahrak; also known as Quanjeg-e Sharak, Ghanjagh, Kanjīk, and Qānjeq) is a village in Qaravolan Rural District, Loveh District, Galikash County, Golestan Province, Iran. At the 2006 census, its population was 957, in 216 families.

References 

Populated places in Galikash County